The Steitalhorn (3,164 m) is a mountain of the Pennine Alps, located west of Embd in the canton of Valais. It lies south of the Augstbord Pass, on the range between the Turtmanntal and the Mattertal, although its summit is within the Mattertal. The Steitalhorn is the culminating point of the group named Steitalgrat.

References

External links
 Steitalhorn on Hikr

Mountains of the Alps
Alpine three-thousanders
Mountains of Valais
Mountains of Switzerland